Qiwllaqucha (Quechua qillwa, qiwlla, qiwiña gull, qucha lake, "gull lake", also spelled Keullacocha) is a small lake in Peru located in the Apurímac Region, Abancay Province, Circa District, southwest of the mountain Pituni.

See also 
 Wask'aqucha

References 

Lakes of Peru
Lakes of Apurímac Region